Anne Grethe Stormorken (born 2 September 1969 in Deventer) is a Dutch sport shooter. She competed in rifle shooting events at the 1988 Summer Olympics.

Olympic results

References

1969 births
Living people
ISSF rifle shooters
Dutch female sport shooters
Shooters at the 1988 Summer Olympics
Olympic shooters of the Netherlands
Sportspeople from Deventer